The South African Railways Class FD 2-6-2+2-6-2 of 1926 was an articulated steam locomotive.

In 1926, the South African Railways placed four Class FD Modified Fairlie articulated steam locomotives with a 2-6-2+2-6-2 Double Prairie type wheel arrangement in service.

Manufacturer
The Class FD Modified Fairlie locomotive was designed and built for the South African Railways (SAR) by the North British Locomotive Company in 1925, to the specifications of Colonel F.R. Collins DSO, Chief Mechanical Engineer of the SAR. Four locomotives were delivered in 1926, numbered in the range from 2320 to 2323. They were later renumbered in the range from 671 to 674.

Characteristics
The Class FD was a heavier and more powerful version of the experimental Class FC which had been placed in service in 1925. It was the Modified Fairlie equivalent of the Class GD 2-6-2+2-6-2 Garratt which was similar in both size and mechanical respects, hence the Class FD designation of these Modified Fairlies. The FA and FB classifications were never used by the SAR. The Class FD locomotives had Walschaerts valve gear, plate frames and were superheated. They proved to be powerful locomotives and good steamers, but they were less successful than their Garratt equivalent.

Shortcomings
They suffered from the same shortcomings as their Class FC predecessor. The overhangs, laden with the water and coal bunkers of which about two-thirds of each extended beyond the respective pivot centres, tended to oscillate in an up-and-down motion while the locomotive was in motion.

In addition to this rather serious defect, the pivot bearings were also subject to quite rapid wear since they carried a considerable additional load compared to those on the Garratt as a result of the water and coal bunkers which were mounted on the main frame instead of on the engine units. This resulted in increased frequency of maintenance and as a consequence, increased operating cost.

Service
The locomotives joined the sole Class FC in service on the Cape Midland System, working on the Grahamstown branch. They were scrapped by 1949.

The long rigid underframe of one of the Class FD locomotives was used to construct a footbridge across the single track at Poet’s Corner Halt on the old Natal mainline between Pinetown and Rossburgh junction in Durban. The underframe forms the main girder of the footbridge.

Illustration

References

2320
NBL locomotives
2-6-2+2-6-2 locomotives
Fairlie locomotives
Cape gauge railway locomotives
Railway locomotives introduced in 1926
1926 in South Africa
Scrapped locomotives